A Killer in the Family is a 1983 American made-for-television crime film directed by Richard T. Heffron. The film is based on the Tison v. Arizona case, which took place in Arizona in 1978. The film first aired on ABC on October 30, 1983, and was released on DVD by Warner Home Video in 2010.

Plot 
Gary Tison is serving two consecutive life sentences for murder, while his three young adolescent sons try to move on with their lives. The oldest, Donny, is the only son making something of his life. He is a pre-law student and is in a loving relationship with his high school sweetheart, Carol. His younger brothers Ricky, who spends his days doing nothing, and Ray, who is a farm laborer, decide (convinced that he is going to be killed by a fellow inmate) to break their father out of prison. Donny, morally challenged, threatens to give them up to the police. Noticing their determination, he agrees to go along, convinced that they can never break Gary out without his help. The three young men drive up to the prison and Donny and Ricky use their guns to keep everyone hostage, while Ray breaks out Gary and his cellmate Randy Greenawalt.

Once outside, the gang grabs the car and drives off in the Arizona landscape. An immediate police announcement is made, warning the citizens that the men are armed and dangerous. Donny laughs off the situation, not believing that any of the fugitives could do anyone harm. However, things change when one night Gary decides to change cars to evade the cops. He hijacks a car and forces the people inside to step out. The driver John Lyons, his wife Dannelda, their young niece Teresa, and their baby are terrified of Gary, even though Donny tries to calm them down by promising they will not harm them. Despite John's promise to Gary that he will not call the cops, Gary fears that the man will betray him and decides to kill him and his family. Realizing that his sons will not allow him, he sends them away to get water for the couple, and then shoots all four of them. The sons are shocked and appalled, and realize their father may not be as innocent and loving as they thought.

The next morning, while in a gas station shop, Ray tells Donny that they could go to the police, since they were not involved with the murders. Donny, however, silences him and explains that Gary will never let them go away. They go back to their father and go into hiding with a female friend of Randy. The gas station shop owner, meanwhile, has recognized the gang from the paper, and warns the police.  They have already fled, though, when they arrive to arrest them, and leave the spot with a newly bought car, heading out to Mexico.

In the end, they are ambushed by the cops. Donny is shot to death, and the other sons are arrested and sent to death row. Gary was able to flee the crime, but his body is found eleven days later.

Cast
 Robert Mitchum as Gary Tison
 James Spader as Donald "Donny" Tison
 Lance Kerwin as Ray Tison
 Eric Stoltz as Ricky Tison
 Salome Jens as Alice Johansen
 Lynn Carlin as Dorothy Tison
 Stuart Margolin as Randy Greenawalt
 Arliss Howard as John Lyons
 Amanda Wyss as Dannelda Lyons
 Susan Swift as Teresa
 Catherine Mary Stewart as Carol
 Liam Duque as Alfan

Production
Parts of the film were shot in St. George, Utah.

See also
Last Rampage, a 2017 film about Gary Tison

References

External links

1983 films
1983 crime drama films
1980s crime thriller films
1983 television films
ABC network original films
American crime thriller films
Films set in 1978
Films set in Arizona
Crime films based on actual events
American crime drama films
Biographical films about criminals
Films directed by Richard T. Heffron
1980s American films